Boston University is a private research university in Boston, Massachusetts USA.

Boston university may refer to several other educational institutions:

Boston College, a private research university in Chestnut Hill, Massachusetts
Boston Graduate School of Psychoanalysis, a graduate school in Brookline, Massachusetts
University of Massachusetts Boston, a public university in Boston, Massachusetts

See also
List of colleges and universities in metropolitan Boston